KDLA (1010 AM) was a radio station licensed to De Ridder, Louisiana, United States. The station was last owned by Christian Broadcasting of De Ridder. Previous owners include Willis Broadcasting and DSN. KDLA's daytime signal covered a large portion of the Lake Charles market. KDLA had a long history of formats over the years from Top-40, Urban, Sports to Religious programming. Its license was surrendered to the Federal Communications Commission on October 1, 2019, and cancelled on October 4, 2019.

References

External links
FCC Station Search Details: DKDLA (Facility ID: 9028)
FCC History Cards for KDLA (covering 1950-1980)

Radio stations in Louisiana
Defunct radio stations in the United States
Radio stations disestablished in 2019
2019 disestablishments in Louisiana
Radio stations established in 1951
1951 establishments in Louisiana
Defunct religious radio stations in the United States
Defunct mass media in Louisiana